Hemtabad Assembly constituency is an assembly constituency in Uttar Dinajpur district in the Indian state of West Bengal. It is reserved for scheduled castes.

Overview
As per orders of the Delimitation Commission, No. 33 Hemtabad Assembly constituency (SC) covers Hemtabad community development block and Bhatol, Bindol, Jagadishpur, Mahipur, Sherpur, Rampur and Sitgram gram panchayats of Raiganj community development block.

Hemtabad Assembly constituency is part of No. 5 Raiganj (Lok Sabha constituency).

Members of Legislative Assembly

Election results

2021
In the 2021 election, Satyajit Barman of Trinamool Congress defeated his nearest rival, Chandima Roy of BJP.

2016
In the 2016 election, Debendra Nath Roy of CPI(M) defeated Sabita Kshetry of Trinamool Congress.

Note- Later in 2019 Debendra Nath Roy joined BJP.

2011
In the 2011 election, Khagendra Nath Sinha of CPI(M) defeated Sekhar Chandra Roy of Trinamool Congress.

 

The Raiganj MP, Deepa Dasmunsi, campaigned for the rebel Congress candidate contesting from Hemtabad as an independent candidate, Chittaranjan Roy, who was suspended from the Congress Party.

References

Assembly constituencies of West Bengal
Politics of Uttar Dinajpur district